Cedar Bluff Township is an inactive township in Oregon County, in the U.S. state of Missouri.

Cedar Bluff Township was established in 1886, and named for a river bluff where cedar trees grew.

References

Townships in Missouri
Townships in Oregon County, Missouri